South School may refer to:

in the United States

 South School (Torrington, Connecticut), listed on the National Register of Historic Places (NRHP)
 South School (Shutesbury, Massachusetts), listed on the NRHP
 South School (Stoneham, Massachusetts), listed on the NRHP
 South School (Yellow Springs, Ohio), listed on the NRHP
 South School (Reedsburg, Wisconsin), listed on the Wisconsin Register of Historic Places
 South School (Stoughton, Wisconsin), listed on the NRHP in Wisconsin